Vendetta is a band with ska and punk rock influences from the Navarre region of Spain.

Discography

Albums 
Vendetta (Gor, 2009)
Puro Infierno
Fuimos, Somos y Seremos - Atzo, Gaur eta Bihar (Baga Biga, 2012)
13 Balas (Baga Biga, 2014)

References

Spanish punk rock groups
Spanish ska groups